St Anne's  or St Annes may refer to:

St. Anne's, Newfoundland and Labrador, Canada
St Anne's, Bristol, England
St. Annes, part of Lytham St Annes, Lancashire, England
St Anne's College, Oxford, a college of the University of Oxford in England
Belfast St Anne's (UK Parliament constituency), Belfast, Northern Ireland

Schools in India
St. Anne's Convent School, Chandigarh
St Anne's Convent School, Baripada
St. Anne's High School (disambiguation)

See also
Church of St. Ann (disambiguation)
Saint Anne's Guild, a medieval religious guild in Dublin, Ireland
St. Anne's Hospital (disambiguation)
Saint Anne's School (disambiguation)
St Ann's (disambiguation)
Saint Anne (disambiguation)
Sainte-Anne (disambiguation)
Santa Ana (disambiguation)
Anna (disambiguation)
Fort Sainte Anne (disambiguation)